The R568 is a Regional Route in South Africa.

Route
Its northeastern terminus is an intersection with the R573 at Siyabuswa, Mpumalanga. It initially heads west, then south-west, again crossing the R573 at KwaMhlanga. It then heads south crossing into Gauteng. It then passes through Ekangala. South of Ekangala, it is briefly co-signed with the R513 and crosses the N4 passing just west of Bronkhorstspruit to end at an intersection with the R25.

References

Regional Routes in Gauteng
Regional Routes in Mpumalanga